Olaf Olsen may refer to:

 Olaf Olsen (drummer) (born 1976), drummer of Norwegian rock band BigBang
 Olaf Olsen (footballer); see 1902 in Norwegian football
 Olaf C. Olsen (1899–?), Socialist legislator from Wisconsin
 Olaf H. Olsen (1928–2015), Danish archeologist
 Olaf L. Olsen (1881–1958), Republican legislator from Washington state
 Olaf Nikolas Olsen (1794–1848), cartographer and Danish army officer
 Olaf Olsen (1919-2000), actor in the 1950 British film Lilli Marlene
 Olaf Olsen (fl. mid-20th century), Norwegian sea captain associated with the history of Rose au Rue, Newfoundland and Labrador, Canada

See also
Olsen (surname)